KSMM (1470 kHz) is an AM radio station licensed to serve the community of Liberal, Kansas, United States. The station is owned by Monte and Doris Miller, through licensee Rocking M Media, LLC, and airs an oldies format as a simulcast of sister station KAHE. The transmitter, tower, and studio were just south of Highway 54 on the east side of town.

History

The station was assigned the call sign KLIB by the Federal Communications Commission on July 20, 1960. The station changed the call sign to KILS on March 1, 1985, then to KYUU on October 4, 1988, when it was part of the "LS Network" of Kansas radio entrepreneur Larry Steckline.

The format in 1984/1985 was adult contemporary, and personalities on the air at that time included Paul Maldanado, Tim Malone, and John Jenkinson. Max Libby was the General Manager.

The call sign changed to KSMM on February 13, 2008.

As part of owner Rocking M Media's bankruptcy reorganization, in which 12 stations in Kansas would be auctioned off to new owners, it was announced on October 31, 2022 that Pittsburg-based MyTown Media was the winning bidder for KSMM for $20,000. While the bankruptcy court has approved the purchase, the sale was officially filed with the FCC on February 2, 2023.

References

External links
Official website
FCC Public Inspection File for KSMM
FCC History Card for KSMM

SMM (AM)
Radio stations established in 1960
1960 establishments in Kansas
Oldies radio stations in the United States
Seward County, Kansas